Goran Obradović (Serbian Cyrillic: Горан Обрадовић; 25 December 198631 August 2021) was a Serbian professional footballer who played as a defender.

Career
On 3 November 2020, Botswana Premier League club Township Rollers announced the signing of Obradović.

Death
Obradović committed suicide on 31 August 2021.

References

External links
 
 
 

1986 births
2021 deaths
Yugoslav footballers
Serbian footballers
Association football defenders
Serbian expatriate footballers
Footballers from Belgrade
FC Ararat Yerevan players
FC Gandzasar Kapan players
FC Alashkert players
FC Mika players
Lanexang United F.C. players
AC Tripoli players
FK BSK Borča players
Al-Mina'a SC players
Kazakhstan Premier League players
Armenian Premier League players
Lebanese Premier League players
Expatriate footballers in Kazakhstan
Expatriate footballers in Armenia
Expatriate footballers in Laos
Expatriate footballers in Lebanon
Expatriate footballers in Iraq
Serbian expatriate sportspeople in Kazakhstan
Serbian expatriate sportspeople in Armenia
Serbian expatriate sportspeople in Lebanon
Serbian expatriate sportspeople in Iraq
Suicides in Serbia